Domašinec is a village and municipality in Međimurje County, Croatia. It is located around 14 kilometres east of Čakovec, the seat and largest city of Međimurje County, and close to the Mura River and border with Hungary.

The Municipality of Domašinec consists of two villages – Domašinec and Turčišće. In the 2011 census, the municipality had a population of 2,251, with 1,700 people living in Domašinec and the remaining 551 in Turčišće.

References

Municipalities of Croatia
Populated places in Međimurje County